Tetralone may refer to either of two chemical isomers:

 1-Tetralone
 2-Tetralone